The 2011–12 Adelaide Bite season will be the second season for the team. As was the case for the previous season, the Bite will compete in the Australian Baseball League (ABL) with the other five foundation teams, and will again play its home games at Coopers Stadium.

Offseason

Regular season

Standings

Record vs opponents

Game log 

|- bgcolor=#bbbbbb
| —
| 3 November
| colspan=7 | Postponed due to rain (5 November)
| 
|- bgcolor=#ffbbbb
| 1
| 4 November
| @ 
| L 6–1
| Cameron Lamb (1–0)
| Dushan Ruzic (0–1)
| 
| 958
| 0–1
| 
|- bgcolor=#bbbbbb
| —
| 5 November
| colspan=7 | Postponed due to rain (6 November)
| 
|- bgcolor=#bbbbbb
| —
| 5 November
| colspan=7 | Postponed due to rain (TBA)
| 
|- bgcolor=#ffbbbb
| 2
| 6 November (DH 1)
| @ 
| L 7–4
| Geoff Brown (1–0)
| Chris Lawson (0–1)
| Benn Grice (1)
| —
| 0–2
| 
|- bgcolor=#ffbbbb
| 3
| 6 November (DH 2)
| @ 
| L 3–2
| Benn Grice (1–0)
| Wayne Ough (0–1)
| 
| 952
| 0–3
| 
|- bgcolor=#ffbbbb
| 4
| 10 November
| 
| L 10–2
| Brian Grening (1–1)
| Dushan Ruzic (0–2)
| 
| 876
| 0–4
| 
|- bgcolor=#bbffbb
| 5
| 11 November
| 
| W 10–7
| Darren Fidge (1–0)
| Hayden Beard (0–1)
| Ryan Beckman (1)
| 1,110
| 1–4
| 
|- bgcolor=#bbffbb
| 6
| 12 November
| 
| W 3–2
| Paul Mildren (1–0)
| Tristan Crawford (0–1)
| Wayne Ough (1)
| 1,360
| 2–4
| 
|- bgcolor=#ffbbbb
| 7
| 13 November
| 
| L 9–5
| Steven Kent (2–0)
| Jandy Sena (0–1)
| Mike McGuire (1)
| 706
| 2–5
| 
|-
| 8
| 24 November
| 
| –
| 
| 
| 
| 
| 
| 
|-
| 9
| 25 November
| 
| –
| 
| 
| 
| 
| 
| 
|-
| 10
| 26 November (DH 1)
| 
| –
| 
| 
| 
| 
| 
| 
|-
| 11
| 26 November (DH 2)
| 
| –
| 
| 
| 
| 
| 
| 
|-

|-
| 12
| 1 December
| 
| –
| 
| 
| 
| 
| 
| 
|-
| 13
| 2 December (DH 1)
| 
| –
| 
| 
| 
| 
| 
| 
|-
| 14
| 2 December (DH 2)
| 
| –
| 
| 
| 
| 
| 
| 
|-
| 15
| 3 December
| 
| –
| 
| 
| 
| 
| 
| 
|-
| 16
| 8 December
| @ 
| –
| 
| 
| 
| 
| 
| 
|-
| 17
| 9 December (DH 1)
| @ 
| –
| 
| 
| 
| 
| 
| 
|-
| 18
| 9 December (DH 2)
| @ 
| –
| 
| 
| 
| 
| 
| 
|-
| 19
| 10 December
| @ 
| –
| 
| 
| 
| 
| 
| 
|-
| 20
| 11 December
| @ 
| –
| 
| 
| 
| 
| 
| 
|-
| 21
| 15 December
| @ 
| –
| 
| 
| 
| 
| 
| 
|-
| 22
| 16 December
| @ 
| –
| 
| 
| 
| 
| 
| 
|-
| 23
| 17 December
| @ 
| –
| 
| 
| 
| 
| 
| 
|-
| 24
| 18 December
| @ 
| –
| 
| 
| 
| 
| 
| 
|-
| 25
| 29 December
| 
| –
| 
| 
| 
| 
| 
| 
|-
| 26
| 30 December
| 
| –
| 
| 
| 
| 
| 
| 
|-
| 27
| 31 December (DH 1)
| 
| –
| 
| 
| 
| 
| 
| 
|-
| 28
| 31 December (DH 2)
| 
| –
| 
| 
| 
| 
| 
| 
|-

|-
| 29
| 1 January
| 
| –
| 
| 
| 
| 
| 
| 
|-
| 30
| 5 January
| @ 
| –
| 
| 
| 
| 
| 
| 
|-
| 31
| 6 January
| @ 
| –
| 
| 
| 
| 
| 
| 
|-
| 32
| 7 January (DH 1)
| @ 
| –
| 
| 
| 
| 
| 
| 
|-
| 33
| 7 January (DH 2)
| @ 
| –
| 
| 
| 
| 
| 
| 
|-
| 34
| 8 January
| @ 
| –
| 
| 
| 
| 
| 
| 
|-
| 35
| 11 January
| @ 
| –
| 
| 
| 
| 
| 
| 
|-
| 36
| 12 January
| @ 
| –
| 
| 
| 
| 
| 
| 
|-
| 37
| 13 January
| @ 
| –
| 
| 
| 
| 
| 
| 
|-
| 38
| 14 January
| @ 
| –
| 
| 
| 
| 
| 
| 
|-
| 39
| 15 January
| @ 
| –
| 
| 
| 
| 
| 
| 
|-
| 40
| 19 January
| 
| –
| 
| 
| 
| 
| 
| 
|-
| 41
| 20 January
| 
| –
| 
| 
| 
| 
| 
| 
|-
| 42
| 21 January (DH 1)
| 
| –
| 
| 
| 
| 
| 
| 
|-
| 43
| 21 January (DH 2)
| 
| –
| 
| 
| 
| 
| 
| 
|-
| 44
| 22 January
| 
| –
| 
| 
| 
| 
| 
| 
|-

Roster

References 

Adelaide Giants
Adelaide Bite